Sunny's Surplus (formerly known as Sunny's Great Outdoors and Sunny's: The Affordable Outdoor Store) was, at its peak, a chain of 29 surplus stores in Maryland, Virginia, and Delaware. The chain was founded in 1948 by Sidney Weinman to sell World War II surplus. The name Sunny's is from the first store Manager. The first store was located at East Baltimore and Frederick Streets in Baltimore, Maryland. It later added camping gear and in 1990 renamed itself Sunny's The Affordable Outdoor Store.

In 2000, Sunny's filed for Chapter 11 protection in U.S. Bankruptcy Court and emerged 13 months later.

In early January 2007, Sunny's began liquidation sales as it prepared to close down all of its locations after the Elkridge-based company filed for Chapter 11 bankruptcy for the second time in a decade. March 16, 2007, marked the final day in which the company's remaining stores (a handful of stores up until this point had closed) were open for business.

In late October and early November 2007, Sunny's reopened its doors with three Maryland stores, in Annapolis, Westminster, and Frederick. These stores were again closed in late March 2008.

Sunny's was a Baltimore landmark and has appeared in Barry Levinson's movie Liberty Heights and show Homicide: Life on the Street. The chain's "dog in the gas mask" commercial was awarded a Clio. At the end of March 2008, Sunny's Surplus closed its remaining physical stores.

In September 2022, Lyfe Rocks Multimedia (LRM) bought the rights to Sunny's Surplus and planned to revive the brand as an ecommerce store.[6]
Currently its website has been transferred to LRM, which is doing business as Baltimore-based Sunny's Surplus Online.

References 

Surplus stores
American companies established in 1948
Retail companies established in 1948
Companies that filed for Chapter 11 bankruptcy in 2000
Companies that filed for Chapter 11 bankruptcy in 2007